Tom Williams House is a historic home located near Williams, Colleton County, South Carolina. The house dates to the 19th century, and is a one-story, clapboard dogtrot style house on brick piers and with a spraddle roof.  It features a front porch supported by six tapered, hand-hewn columns. The house was owned by and housed the family of Tom Williams, a much respected middle class farmer who donated land for the town that was named in his honor.  In 1914, it was used as a tenant house for the Warren and Griffin Lumber Company.

It was listed in the National Register of Historic Places in 1973.

References

Houses on the National Register of Historic Places in South Carolina
Houses in Colleton County, South Carolina
National Register of Historic Places in Colleton County, South Carolina